Ruben De Pra (born 16 June 1980 in Belluno) is an Italian retired pair skater. With partner Michela Cobisi, he is the 2001 & 2002 Italian national champion. They placed 19th at the 2002 Winter Olympics. Prior to teaming up with Cobisi, he skated with Elisa Carenini, with whom he competed twice at the World Junior Figure Skating Championships.

Results
(with Cobisi)

References

External links
 Tracings.net profile
 Pairs on Ice: Cobisi & De Pra
 Pairs on Ice: Carenini & De Pra

Italian male pair skaters
Olympic figure skaters of Italy
Figure skaters at the 2002 Winter Olympics
1980 births
Living people
People from Belluno
Sportspeople from the Province of Belluno